Evgeniy Gennadyevich Cheremisin (born 29 February 1988) is a Russian former footballer.

Career
Cheremisin made his professional debut for Rubin Kazan on 13 July 2010 in the Russian Cup game against FC Volgar-Gazprom Astrakhan.

Honours
 Russian Super Cup: 2010

External links
 Player page on the official FC Rubin Kazan website
 
 
 

1988 births
People from Naberezhnye Chelny
Living people
Russian footballers
Russian expatriate footballers
Association football goalkeepers
FC Rubin Kazan players
FC Dynamo Saint Petersburg players
FC Fakel Voronezh players
FC KAMAZ Naberezhnye Chelny players
FK Neftchi Farg'ona players
FC Neftekhimik Nizhnekamsk players
FC Qizilqum Zarafshon players
Uzbekistan Super League players
Russian Second League players
Russian First League players
Russian expatriate sportspeople in Uzbekistan
Expatriate footballers in Uzbekistan
Expatriate footballers in Kyrgyzstan
Sportspeople from Tatarstan